This is a list of electoral division results for the 2013 Australian federal election in the state of South Australia.

Overall results

Results by division

Adelaide

Barker

Boothby

Grey

Hindmarsh

Kingston

Makin

Mayo

Port Adelaide

Sturt

Wakefield

References

See also 

 Results of the 2013 Australian federal election (House of Representatives)
 Post-election pendulum for the 2013 Australian federal election
 Members of the Australian House of Representatives, 2013–2016

South Australia 2013